Unknown Mortal Orchestra is the debut album by the New Zealand rock band Unknown Mortal Orchestra, released on 21 June 2011 on Fat Possum Records.

The album won the 2012 Taite Music Prize.

Background and recording
Ruban Nielson left The Mint Chicks in the beginning of 2010, citing a loss of interest in the group's music. Following an incident during one of the band's live performances and Nielson's subsequent departure, The Mint Chicks broke up. Nielson had already returned to Portland, Oregon, where he began working at a film production company as an illustrator. He quickly found himself wanting to write and record music again and began searching for "psychedelic records with lost tunes" for inspiration. Nielson had become very specific about what type of record he wanted to find for inspiration and, with that specificity, began making that record himself instead. Once he had finished writing and recording the album's first song, Nielson uploaded it anonymously on 17 May 2010 onto Bandcamp under the name "Ffunny Ffrends". Within a day, the song had received significant coverage from independent music blogs such as Pitchfork.

Nielson maintained the band's anonymity as he was not sure what he wanted the band to be and did not want to "face up to Mint Chicks fans and to people who were looking forward to a new Mint Chicks record." Nielson eventually claimed the track under the band name Unknown Mortal Orchestra.

On the subject of the album's recording subsequent to the coverage of and reception towards "Ffunny Ffrends", Nielson said:

Artwork

The album artwork is a photograph of the Monument to the uprising of the people of Kordun and Banija, a Yugoslav World War II memorial monument built on Petrovac, the highest peak of Petrova Gora, a mountain range in central Croatia. Designed by Vojin Bakić and built in 1981, the monument is one of many monuments commissioned by Josip Broz Tito, leader of the League of Communists of Yugoslavia, and is dedicated to the Partisans of Kordun and Banija who were killed during World War II.

The monument was the site of one of the tragic World War II episodes, when about 300 desperate Serb peasants armed only with pitchforks, died attacking the Ustasha Militia at the top of the mountain, during breakthrough of the enemy ring in 1942. The monument is a symbol of suffering and heroic struggle for most of the Serbian population in this region, who, starting in the spring of 1941, had been the subject of Ustasha crimes and genocide. After the founding of the first Partisan units in Kordun and Banija, Croats and Serbs fought together against fascism and occupation.

On the subject of the album artwork, frontman Ruban Nielson said:

Critical reception

Unknown Mortal Orchestra received positive reviews from contemporary music critics. At Metacritic, which assigns a normalized rating out of 100 to reviews from mainstream critics, the album received an average score of 73, based on 16 reviews, which indicates "generally favorable reviews".

Ian Cohen of Pitchfork gave the album a favorable review, stating, "Combined with an expert use of space rare for such a lo-fi record, UMO manages a unique immersive and psychedelic quality without relying on the usual array of bong-ripping effects." Neil Condron of NME praised the album, stating, "Unknown Mortal Orchestra is almost unwillingly accomplished, a scruffy blend of shuffling funk and psych nostalgia that feels a lot more right than it should. Even the Dictaphone-style production works, giving this debut a Haunted Graffiti-esque mugginess, clipping the claws of the guitar hooks. Nielson probably didn’t know what he was getting into when he started UMO and is probably still figuring it out now. If that means more sleepless nights for him, all the better for us." Spin Nate Brennan called the record "a kaleidoscopic psych-rock gem".

Tim Sendra of AllMusic praised the album, stating, "It could have turned into a self-indulgent mess at some point, but Nielson never forgets that while it’s cool to make cool sounds, it’s better to write cool songs. And every song on the record is quite cool, some are even really great. The opening "Ffunny Ffriends," with its summer day, hazy sound and naggingly catchy vocal line, is one. So is the punchy "How Can You Luv Me," which comes off like a Beck jam only without the meta-cutesy vibe. Really, you could single out any song on the album for praise or inclusion on a killer summer mixtape and you wouldn't go wrong. The Mint Chicks were a decent band, but with Unknown Mortal Orchestra, Ruban Nielson is onto something a lot more interesting and fun." Wilson McBee of Prefix Magazine gave the album a favorable review, stating, "Unknown Mortal Orchestra has produced the rare indie pop record that seizes you on the first listen but also rewards repeated playing. The former is due to the power of Nielson's hooks, and the latter to his virtuoso guitar work and intricate production. The veil in front of Nielson's identity may have been removed, but plenty of mystery and excitement awaits anyone digging into his strange, rich music."

Dylan Nelson of PopMatters was more critical of the album, stating, "Unknown Mortal Orchestra is an ambitious debut, there can be no doubt about that. But too often, the careful distribution of musical allusions and sonic ambiguities devolves into perfunctory assertions of individuality. It would seem that Nielson's preoccupation with making the group sound different has made it sound unlike even itself. No matter how curious or inviting the artifacts, after too long, even record collectors’ ideal junkshop will give them toxic shock." Erik Adams of The A.V. Club gave the album a more favorable review, stating, "Nielson’s upper-register rasp occasionally recalls that of Paul McCartney, which seems appropriate—as a mercurial experiment in home recording, Unknown Mortal Orchestra lines up nicely with the ex-Beatle's McCartney and McCartney II LPs. And like those two releases, Unknown Mortal Orchestras idiosyncrasies and straightforward melodies portend greater, untapped potential."

Accolades

Track listing

Personnel
 Ruban Nielson – vocals, electric and acoustic guitar, bass guitar, drums, percussion

See also
 List of Yugoslav World War II monuments and memorials

References

2011 debut albums
Unknown Mortal Orchestra albums
Fat Possum Records albums
True Panther Sounds albums